Arizona City may refer to:

 Arizona City, Arizona in Pinal County, Arizona
 Arizona City (Yuma, Arizona) a settlement now known as Yuma, Arizona.